Southside is an incorporated city located in Independence County, Arkansas, United States.

The elevation of Southside is 354 feet (108 m).

The spur route of Arkansas Highway 14 connects Southside with Salado.

History 
Southside was incorporated on October 29, 2014.

Demographics

As of the 2020 United States census, there were 4,279 people, 1,560 households, and 1,002 families residing in the city.

Education 
Students in Southside can go to Southside School District or Batesville School District, Arkansas.

References

External links
Encyclopedia of Arkansas History & Culture entry

Cities in Arkansas
Cities in Independence County, Arkansas
Populated places established in 2014